The 2014 Shoot Out (officially the 2014 888casino Snooker Shoot Out) was a professional non-ranking snooker tournament that took place between 24 and 26 January 2014 at the Circus Arena in Blackpool. It was played under a  variation of the standard rules of snooker.

Martin Gould was the defending champion, but he lost 14–40 against Zhang Anda in round one.

Dominic Dale won the final 1–0 (77–19) against Stuart Bingham.

Prize fund
The breakdown of prize money for this year is shown below:
Winner: £32,000
Runner-up: £16,000
Semi-final: £8,000
Quarter-final: £4,000
Last 16: £2,000
Last 32: £1,000
Last 64: £500
Highest break: £2,000
Total: £130,000

Draw
The draw for round one was made on 8 December 2013 and was broadcast live by Talksport. The draw for each round including the semi-finals was made at random, conducted live at the venue. There was only one century break during the tournament. Ryan Day made a 101 break against Kurt Maflin.

Top half

Bottom half

Final

Century breaks 
 101   Ryan Day

References

External links
 2014 888casino Snooker Shoot Out – Pictures by World Snooker at Facebook

2014
Snooker Shoot-Out
Snooker Shoot-Out
Snooker Shoot-Out
Sport in Blackpool